Andrea Massucchi (born 1974) is an Italian artistic gymnast. He won the silver medal on vault at the 1996 World Artistic Gymnastics Championships in San Juan, tied with Yeo Hong-chul and placing behind Alexei Nemov.

References 

1997 deaths
1974 births
Italian male artistic gymnasts
Sportspeople from the Province of Vercelli
Medalists at the World Artistic Gymnastics Championships
People from Vercelli